Khalil Azmi (born 23 August 1964) is a retired Moroccan football goalkeeper. He played ten seasons in the Moroccan League, two in the USISL, two in the National Professional Soccer League, one in the A-League and one in Major League Soccer.

Career
In 1984, Azmi began his career with Wydad Casablanca in the Moroccan League.  In 1992, he moved to Raja Casablanca.  In 1995, he moved to the United States where he played for the New Hampshire Ramblers in the USISL.  In February 1996, the Colorado Rapids selected him in the 14th round (132nd overall) of the 1996 MLS Inaugural Player Draft.  He never got off the bench with the Rapids and spent part of the season on loan with the New York Fever in the A-League in 1996.  In 1997, he played for the Charleston Battery in the USISL.  That fall, he signed with the Baltimore Spirit of the National Professional Soccer League.  He spent two winter indoor seasons with the Spirit.  In 1998, he played for the Hershey Wildcats in the USISL.

He was a member of the Morocco team which played in the 1994 FIFA World Cup, playing in two matches.

References

External links
 FIFA: Khalil Azmi

1964 births
Footballers from Casablanca
1994 FIFA World Cup players
American Professional Soccer League players
Baltimore Blast (NPSL) players
Baltimore Spirit players
Charleston Battery players
Colorado Rapids players
Association football goalkeepers
Hershey Wildcats players
Living people
Moroccan expatriate footballers
Moroccan expatriate sportspeople in the United States
Moroccan footballers
Morocco international footballers
National Professional Soccer League (1984–2001) players
New York Fever players
Expatriate soccer players in the United States
Botola players
Raja CA players
A-League (1995–2004) players
USL Second Division players
Wydad AC players
1988 African Cup of Nations players
1992 African Cup of Nations players